Johnsontown is a neighborhood of Louisville, Kentucky located along Dixie Highway (US 31W) and Johnsontown Road.

Geography

References
  

Neighborhoods in Louisville, Kentucky